Zanget-e Olya (also Romanized as Zanget-e ‘Olyā; also known as Bālā Zanger, Bālā Zanget, and Zanget-e Bālā) is a village in Zarem Rud Rural District, Hezarjarib District, Neka County, Mazandaran Province, Iran. At the 2006 census, its population was 67, in 20 families.

References 

Populated places in Neka County